The THE University of the Year is an annual award given to an Irish or British university or other higher education institution by Times Higher Education. The current University of the Year for 2022 is Northumbria University.

The annual award was established in 2005, with shortlisted universities announced in September and winners announced in a ceremony in October/November. The winner is chosen by a panel of judges including the editor of the publication, senior university administrators, and senior members of research and funding councils.

Although similar in name, this award has no connection to the Sunday Times University of the Year award given by The Times.

List of winners

Universities with multiple wins and shortlists

References

Educational awards in the United Kingdom
Awards established in 2005 
2005 establishments in the United Kingdom
Universities in the United Kingdom
Annual events in the United Kingdom